Aultman Hospital is a non-profit hospital located in Canton, Ohio, United States. It is the largest hospital and the largest employer, with over 5000 employees, in Stark County.

In January 1890, Mrs. Elizabeth Harter, daughter of Cornelius Aultman, purchased  of land in the southwest end of Canton. The hospital opened on January 17, 1892.

In 1925, the Harter Building was constructed, adding 100 beds to the 40-room hospital. The McKinley Building opened in 1944, expanding the facility by another 106 beds. Three years later, another 117 beds were added by the opening of the Harter Annex. In 1954, the Main Building and the Morrow House were completed. The Main Building replaced the hospital's original structure and included 139 additional beds. Currently, the hospital boasts 1032 beds and 530 active physicians in 43 specialties. Aultman runs a Preferred Provider Organization, AultCare.

Awards 
Aultman Hospital has been the recipient of several awards, including:

 Magnet National Nursing Award
 National Research Corporation:  Stark County's "Most Preferred Hospital" for 14 consecutive years
 Ohio Award for Excellence 
 J.D. Power and Associates 
 Commission on Cancer 
 American Heart Association/American Stroke Association  
 American Association of Critical-Care Nurses
 100 Top Hospitals
 Top 50 Cardiac Hospitals
 American Heart Association Triple Gold Recognition, 2008

References

External links
Aultman Homepage
Aultman College of Nursing and Health Sciences

Hospital buildings completed in 1892
Hospital buildings completed in 1925
Hospital buildings completed in 1944
Hospital buildings completed in 1957
Hospitals in Ohio
Buildings and structures in Canton, Ohio
Trauma centers